Wilson House, also known as the Hull House, is a historic home located at Fort Mill, York County, South Carolina. It was built about 1869, and is a two-story, three bay, frame I-house with several one-story rear additions.  The front façade features hip roofed porch with decorative brackets and turned balustrade in the Late Victorian style.

It was added to the National Register of Historic Places in 1992.

References

Houses on the National Register of Historic Places in South Carolina
Victorian architecture in South Carolina
Houses completed in 1869
Houses in York County, South Carolina
National Register of Historic Places in York County, South Carolina
1869 establishments in South Carolina